The Montenegrin national basketball team represents Montenegro in men's international basketball tournaments. It is organized by the Basketball Federation of Montenegro (Montenegrin: Кошаркашки Савез Црне Горе, КСЦГ; Košarkaški Savez Crne Gore, KSCG), which is the governing body of basketball in Montenegro. This team competes in the European region of FIBA.

Records 
Largest home victory 102-58,  – , 26 August 2009, Podgorica
Largest away victory 37-100,  – , 2 June 2017, Serravalle
Largest home defeat 65-80,  – , 20 August 2014, Podgorica
Largest away defeat 99-60,  – , 1 September 2017, Cluj-Napoca
Longest winning streak 13 matches, (6 September 2008 - 14 August 2010)
Longest losing streak 4 matches, (1 September 2011 - 5 September 2011; 1 September 2019 - 9 September 2019)
Most scored points in a match 113,  –  73-113
Least scored points in a match 55,  –  71-55,  –  68-55
Most conceded points in a match 100,  –  100-68
Least conceded points in a match 37,  –  37-100
Highest home attendance 5,500,  –  72-62, 2 September 2012, Podgorica
Highest away attendance 18,000,  –  71-73, 18 August 2012, Belgrade

List of official matches 
Montenengro played its first official match at September 2008. Below is a list of all official matches played by the national team since Montenegrin independence.

Montenegro vs. other countries 
Below is the list of performances of Montenegro national basketball team against every single opponent.

Last update: 28 February 2020

See also
 Montenegro national basketball team
 Sport in Montenegro
 Montenegrin Basketball League
 Montenegro women's national basketball team

External links
Official Website of the Basketball Federation of Montenegro (KSCG)

results
Montenegro